Tamami (written: 珠美 or 珠実) is a feminine Japanese given name. Notable people with the name include:

, Japanese figure skater
, Japanese biathlete
, Japanese professional basketball player

See also
Tamami: The Baby's Curse, a 2008 film

Japanese feminine given names